Belogorka is a rural locality (a selo) in Tomsky Selsoviet of Seryshevsky District, Amur Oblast, Russia. The population was 333 as of 2018. There are 2 streets.

Geography 
Belogorka is located 28 km southeast of Seryshevo (the district's administrative centre) by road. Khitrovka is the nearest rural locality.

References 

Rural localities in Seryshevsky District